The Metric Act of 1866, also known as the Kasson Act, is a piece of United States legislation that legally protected use of the metric system in commerce from lawsuit, and provided an official conversion table from U.S. customary units.

History

Congressman John A. Kasson from Iowa, then Chairman of the House Committee on Coinage, Weights, and Measures, proposed the act in his report of the Committee on Coinage, Weights, and Measures:

The metric system is already used in some arts and trades in this country, and is especially adapted to the wants of others. Some of its measures are already manufactured at Bangor, in Maine, to meet an existing demand at home and abroad. The manufacturers of the well-known Fairbanks scales state: “For many years we have had a large export demand for our scales with French weights, and the demand and sale is constantly increasing.” Its minute and exact divisions specially adapt it to the use of chemists, aphothecaries, the finer operations of the artisan, and to all scientific objects. It has always been and is now used in the United States coast survey. Yet in some of the States, owing to the phraseology of their laws, it would be a direct violation of them to use it in the business transactions of the community. It is therefore very important to legalize its use, and give to the people, or that portion of them desiring it, the opportunity for its legal employment, while the knowledge of its characteristics will be thus diffused among men. Chambers of commerce, boards of trade, manufacturing associations, and other voluntary societies, and individuals, will be induced to consider and in their discretion to adopt its use. The interests of trade among a people so quick as ours to receive and adopt a useful novelty, will soon acquaint practical men with its convenience. When this is attained—a period, it is hoped, not distant—a further act of Congress can fix a date for its exclusive adoption as a legal system. At an earlier period it may be safely introduced into all public offices, and for government service.
In the schedule of equivalents provided in the bill, extreme scientific accuracy is not expressed. The reasons follow. The exact length of the meter in inches and the weight of the kilogram in grains can of necessity be determined only approximately. The most careful determinations of these quantities now possible are liable to minute corrections hereafter, as more numerous observations are made and better instruments are used. Instead, therefore, of aiming at an accuracy greater, perhaps, than is attainable, it is more expedient to consult the convenience of the people by using the simplest numbers possible in the schedule, and yet such as shall be in fact more nearly exact than can ever be demanded in the ordinary business of life. These numbers are to be used in schools, and in practical life millions of times as multipliers and divisors, and every unnecessary additional figure is justly objectionable.
In a popular sense of the word, however, the numbers in the schedule may be said to be exact. The length of the meter, for example, is given as 39.37 inches. The mean of the best English and the best American determinations differs from this only by about the amount by which the standard bar changes its length by a change of one degree of temperature. Such accuracy is certainly sufficient for legal purposes and for popular use.

The House passed it on 17 May 1866; the Senate passed it on July 27, 1866; and it was presented to President Andrew Johnson and signed the next day.

Metric Weights and Measures
The Act included a now-obsolete definition of the metric system and tables of units. (The notes at the end of some tables are not from the original document itself but are included for clarity.)

Notes,
Stère: [Greek > Stereo = "Solid"] A metric measurement of firewood or lumber equivalent to the cord. 

Notes,
The metric measures in brackets in the above table are not from the original document but are conversions into kilograms for clarity. 
Millier: [ French > mille = “a thousand”] 1) A unit of a thousand. 2a) A metric ton. 2b) A thousand kilos. 2c) A million grams.
Quintal: [ medieval Latin > quintale; Arabic > qinṭār; classical Latin > centenarius = ‘containing a hundred units’] 1) A customary unit of weight equal to 100 pounds. 2) British: A unit of weight equal to a hundredweight (112 lb). 3) A metric unit of weight equal to 100 kilograms.
Tonneau: [ French > "barrel"] A weight equal to 1 million grams (or 1 millier), 10 quintals, 100 Myriagrams, or 1,000 Kilograms.

Amendments
It replaced the old definition of the metric system with the modern-day definition of SI.

The Millier and Tonneau (1,000,000 grams) were replaced by the Megagram.
The Stère (1 cubic meter) and Quintal (100,000 grams) are no longer officially part of the metric system.
The Myriameter (10,000 meters) and Myriagram (10,000 grams) were dropped as unnecessary units. They are now expressed in kilometers and kilograms (units of 1,000).

See also 

 Seconds pendulum

References

1866 in American law
1866 in American politics
International System of Units
Metrication in the United States